The Jesup North Pacific Expedition (1897–1902) was a major anthropological expedition to Siberia, Alaska, and the northwest coast of Canada. The purpose of the expedition was to investigate the relationships among the peoples at each side of the Bering Strait.

The multi-year expedition was sponsored by American industrialist-philanthropist Morris Jesup (who was among other things the president of the American Museum of Natural History). It was planned and directed by the American anthropologist Franz Boas. The participants included a number of significant figures in American and Russian anthropology, as well as Bernard Fillip Jacobsen (brother of Johan Adrian Jacobsen), a Norwegian, who settled in the Northwest coast in 1884 where he collected artifacts as well as the stories of the local indigenous people. Local people of the tribes, such as George Hunt (Tlingit), served as interpreters and guides.

The expedition resulted in the publication of numerous important ethnographies from 1905 into the 1930s, as well as valuable collections of artifacts and photographs.

Fieldwork sites
The ethnic groups studied by members of the expedition include:

Ainu
Tsilhqot'in (Chilcotin, British Columbia)
Chukchi (Chukchee)
Evens (Lamut)
Evenk (Tungus)
Haida
Heiltsuk (Bella Bella)
Itel'men (Kamchadal)
Kwakwaka'wakw (Kwakiutl)
St'at'imc (Lillooet) (British Columbia)
Nlaka'pamux (Thompson) (British Columbia)
Syilx (Okanagan) (British Columbia)

Official publications
Many of the scientific results of the expedition were published in a special series, Publications of the Jesup North Pacific Expedition (New York: American Museum of Natural History, 1898-1903 [and] Leiden : E.J. Brill ; New York : G.E. Stechert, 1905–1930). The titles of these publications give a good idea of the huge scope of the expedition:

Other results of the expedition were published separately. Waldemar Bogoras's grammar of Chukchi, Koryak and Itelmen (misleadingly titled just Chukchee) was delayed by the onset of the First World War and Russian Revolution. It was eventually published (heavily edited by Boas) in the Handbook of American Indian Languages.

Expedition direction

Franz Boas
Franz Boas, one of the pioneers of modern anthropology, was the scientific director of the expedition. At the time of the expedition he was assistant curator of the anthropology department at the American Museum of Natural History. He planned the research to address three questions:

 the origin of the early inhabitants of America
 the biological relationship between the peoples of America and the peoples of Asia
 the relationships between the cultures of the peoples of America and the peoples of Asia

Boas was an active fieldworker on the northwest coast in the American part of the expedition.

Morris Jesup
Morris Ketchum Jesup, a wealthy industrialist and director of the American Museum of Natural History, initially invited contributions from benefactors to the museum, but ended up assuming the entire expense of the project himself.

Fieldworkers in Russia
The Siberian fieldwork began a year later. There were three teams, one in the south and two in the north. The southern team comprised Berthold Laufer and Gerard Fowke. Bogoras and Jochelson each had a team in the north.

Berthold Laufer
Berthold Laufer was an ethnologist. He worked on the Amur River and Sakhalin Island during 16 months over 1898-1899. He studied the Nivkhi, Evenk and Ainu, and published a monograph in the expedition series, The decorative art of the Amur tribes.

Gerard Fowke
Gerard Fowke, an archaeologist,

Waldemar Bogoras
Waldemar Bogoras was an exiled Russian revolutionary; ethnographic and linguistic fieldwork with the Chukchi and Siberian Yupik peoples of the western side of the Bering Strait. He was accompanied on the expedition by his wife Sofia Bogoraz, who acted as photographer.

Dina Brodsky
Dina Brodsky (aka Jochelson-Brodskaya)
was a trained medic. She compiled an ethnography and photographic record of Koryak and Itelmen communities (with husband Waldemar Jochelson). She took the majority of the expedition's 1,200 pictures. Her work was unpaid. Her 900 anthropological measurements contributed to her doctoral dissertation at the University of Zurich and to her writings about the women of northeastern Siberia.

Waldemar Jochelson
Vladimir Jochelson
(with wife Dina Jochelson-Brodskaya)

Fieldworkers in Canada and the United States

Livingston Farrand
Livingston Farrand

George Hunt
George Hunt; much info at  recorded Kwakiutl texts

Harlan I. Smith
Smith involved himself in archaeological work, and began by digging in the Thompson River district of British Columbia in 1897. In successive years, he worked a little farther east, and also around Puget Sound, and down the west coast of the state of Washington. The interest was in the people who inhabited these regions in prehistoric times. One small section east of the city of Vancouver was found to reveal traces of a people with a much more highly developed technology than others of the region. Some of the regions explored revealed the remains of coast tribes, others of interior tribes. At some points these characteristics merged, producing a different type.

New discoveries of one season explained things not understood in previous explorations, so to gather up missing links and further elucidate the whole region, especially the people of the small section near Vancouver, it was necessary to take up some new territory and thoroughly explore it. Smith, therefore, went into the Yakima River Valley in northern Washington in 1903. On the map, this section does not look far from the Thompson River district in British Columbia, but Smith found not only their culture, but their skulls were different.

These ancient tribes seemed to have lived, each in its nook of coast or river valley, for unnumbered ages, never going to see what was on the other side of the mountain, each developing its own morsel of civilization in its own way, its life and culture and development modified by the portion of the earth's surface where it sat down, seemingly to stay forever. Shell heaps were found miles in length, with tree stumps six feet in diameter standing on nine feet of layers, of which each layer was only an inch or two in thickness. It took a good many generations to pile up those successive layers with discards from shellfish dinners. A stump of Douglas fir, over six feet in diameter, stood on a shell heap eight feet below the surface which contained human remains. The tree indicated the top layers of the shell heap were more than 500 years old.

The material brought back included carved and sculptured pipes, stone mortars, pestles, and sinkers, bone implements used on spears, deer antlers used as handles, stone adzes differing from those found anywhere else, bone needles, shell ornaments, and the like. In addition, many paintings and sculptures on rock walls were photographed.

John Swanton
John Swanton

James Teit
James Teit see:  and

Bruno Oetteking
Bruno Oetteking

References

External links
More biographical information about the Jesup North Pacific Expedition members is also available from the AMNH website

Pre-statehood history of Alaska
History of British Columbia
History of Siberia
North American expeditions
Asian expeditions
Expeditions from the United States